Rajpora, also known as Rajpur,  is a Village and a Tehsil in the Pulwama district of the Kashmir Valley of Jammu and Kashmir, India. It is located 43 km away from Srinagar and 299 km away from Jammu.

Demographics
As per census of 2011 population of Rajpora stands at 5,215, with 2,756 males and 2,459 females. Population of people under the age of 6 in Rajpora is 1,169, which is 22.42% of total population of the village. Average Sex Ratio of Rajpora village is 892 and child Sex Ratio of the Rajpora as per census of 2011 is 729. In 2011, literacy rate of Rajpora was 62% in which male literacy stands at 57.67% while female literacy rate stands at 51.61%.

Villages
1. Abhama
2. Achagoza 
3. Bamnoo
4. Pachahar
5. Drabgam
6. Rohmoo
7. Kalampora
8. Shadimarg
9. Sangarwani
10. Thokerpora
11. Mirgund
12. Khaigam
13.Rahmoo
14. Bellow

Governance
Under the Panchyati Raj Act, Rajpora is administered by the Sarpanch.

Economy
Out of total population only 3,289 people were employed as of 2011 census.
Rest of the population is engaged in orchard business. This village has huge dependency on horticulture and other allied sectors like dairy and bread business, a local bread namely  Shirmal is world wide famous of this village, exported to other countries like USA ,Australia, UAE ,and other Gulf countries....

Education
Government Degree College, Rajpora
Govt Model Higher Secondary Rajpora

Castes

Schedule Tribe (ST) constitutes 0.29% of total population in Rajpora. No Scheduled Caste (SC) live in Rajpora.

References

Cities and towns in India
Cities and towns in Jammu and Kashmir
Cities and towns in Pulwama district
Villages in Pulwama district
History of the Republic of India
States and territories established in 1947
1947 establishments in India
Kashmiri-speaking countries and territories